Woolpit Green is a hamlet in Suffolk, England near the village of Woolpit.

External links

Hamlets in Suffolk
Woolpit